Martin Katz may refer to:
 Martin Katz (pianist)
 Martin Katz (jewelry designer)
 Martin Katz (producer)